The 1907–08 ECAHA season was the third season of the Eastern Canada Amateur Hockey Association (ECAHA). lasted from . Teams played a ten-game schedule. The Montreal Wanderers would win the league championship with a record of eight wins, two losses.

League business

Executive 

 Dr. George Cameron, Montreal (President)
 Joe Power, Quebec (1st Vice-President)
 Patrick J. Baskerville, Ottawa (2nd Vice-President)
 W. P. Lunny, Shamrocks (Secretary-Treasurer)

The Nationals applied for a franchise but did not get three-fourths approval.

Mr. Baskerville demanded better protection be given visiting teams at Quebec,
as stones had been thrown at the Senators on their last visit.

Rule Changes 

 Teams could now openly pay players. Players would have to declare their professional or amateur status. The Victorias would remain strictly amateur.

Hod Stuart Benefit All-Star Game 

The first All-Star game in ice hockey was played on January 2, 1908, before 3,500 fans at the Montreal Arena between the Montreal Wanderers and a team of All-Stars players from the teams the Eastern Canada Amateur Hockey Association. It was held in memory of Montreal Wanderers player Hod Stuart, who had drowned three months after the Wanderers won the Stanley Cup in 1907. The sale of tickets, from 25 cents to $1, raised $2,000 for Mr. Stuart's widow and two children.

Regular season 

Russell Bowie of Victorias led the scoring championship with 31 goals. This was the fifth time in ten seasons that Bowie would lead the scorers.

There was a large amount of player turnover. For the Wanderers, Hod Stuart of Wanderers had died in the off-season, Lester Patrick had moved west, and new players would include Art Ross from Brandon, Tom Hooper of Kenora and Ernie Russell formerly of Montreal HC.

Ottawa lost Harry Smith and Hamby Shore who moved to Winnipeg and Billy Gilmour who joined the Victorias. Ottawa added Cyclone Taylor from Portage Lakes, Tommy Phillips from Kenora, and Marty Walsh from the Canadian Soo.

Montreal Shamrocks signed up Didier Pitre and Jack Laviolette from the International League.

Quebec Bulldogs had three Power brothers in the lineup: Joe, Charles aka 'Chubby' and James aka 'Rocket'.

Montreal Victorias signed Frank Patrick of McGill and Billy Gilmour.

Wanderers played without three of their players from winning the Stanley Cup (Blatchford, Glass and Smail) and lost 11–5 to Renfrew.

Highlights 

Ottawa opened their new Arena, hosting the Wanderers on January 11, 1908, overloading capacity with 7,100 attending. Ottawa defeated the Wanderers 12–2. Ottawa and Wanderers were tied for first going into their rematch on February 29, when the Ottawa manager J. P. Dickson resigned in a dispute over which train to take to Montreal. At the time, two trains were available for the trip, and the two would race, with betting taking place on the winner. In the actual game, the two defence stars Art Ross and Cyclone Taylor would lead end-to-end rushes, and the game would be tied until Taylor was injured, and Bruce Stuart and Walter Smaill would score for the Wanderers to win 4–2.

On January 18, Quebec would defeat Montreal 18–5, with Chubby Power scoring six.

Russell Bowie would score five in a game three times, Marty Walsh would have the biggest game, scoring seven, and six in another. Tom Phillips would score five twice, Herb Jordan would score six and five, and Jack Marshall would score five twice.

Final standing

Stanley Cup challenges 

Wanderers played in three challenges, during the season against Ottawa Victorias and after the season, against Winnipeg and Toronto. All games were played at the Montreal Arena.

Wanderers vs. Ottawa 
During the season, Wanderers would play a challenge against the Ottawa Victorias of the Federal Amateur Hockey League. On January 9–13, the Wanderers would win 9–3, 13–1 (22–4). Eddie Roberts broke his collarbone in the first game and was replaced by Gerard. Only 500 attended the second game.

Wanderers vs. Winnipeg 
Wanderers defeated Winnipeg Maple Leafs in a two-game series 11–5, 9–3 (20–8) March 10–12.

Wanderers vs. Toronto 
The Wanderers then took on Toronto of the Ontario Professional Hockey League in a challenge. The Wanderers defeated Toronto 6–4 on March 14 on two late goals by Ernie Johnson and Bruce Stuart.

* Bruce Ridpath was Playing-Manager-Coach-Captain of 1908 Toronto Professionals

Source: Coleman

Schedule and results 
1907

1908

Player statistics

Goaltending averages

Leading scorers

Stanley Cup engraving 
The 1908 Stanley Cup was presented by the trophy's trustee William Foran. The Wanderers never did engrave their names on the Cup for their championship season.

The following Wanderers players and staff were members of the winning team.

1908 Montreal Wanderers

See also 
 Eastern Canadian Amateur Hockey Association
 List of pre-NHL seasons
 List of ice hockey leagues

References 

Bibliography
 
 

Eastern Canada Amateur Hockey Association seasons
ECHA